Eric M. Ueland (born July 12, 1965) is an American political advisor and government official in the Trump administration. He served as the acting Under Secretary of State for Civilian Security, Democracy, and Human Rights from 2020 to 2021 and previously as the Acting Principal Deputy Assistant Secretary for International Organization Affairs in 2020.

Early life and education 
Ueland was born and raised in Portland, Oregon. After graduating from Central Catholic High School, Ueland earned a Bachelor of Arts degree in History from the University of San Francisco.

Career 
Ueland has served in senior positions in the United States Senate since 1996, including as chief of staff for Republican Senate Majority Leader Bill Frist and Assistant Majority Leader Don Nickles. Roll Call described Ueland as a "longtime budget and Senate rules expert" who is "regarded as one of the smarter procedural strategists for the Republicans."

From 2007 to 2013, Ueland was vice president of the Duberstein Group. He has served as the Republican Staff Director of the United States Senate Committee on the Budget since being hired by Jeff Sessions in 2013. Ueland was a member of Donald Trump's transition team.

He was President Donald Trump's first nominee to become Under Secretary of State for Management in June 2017. His unsuccessful nomination was withdrawn in June 2018 in favor of Brian Bulatao.

Between October 2018 to March 2019, Ueland served as the Director of the Office of U.S. Foreign Assistance Resources at the Department of State. In April 2019, he joined the White House as a Deputy Assistant to the President and Deputy Director of the Domestic Policy Council. He served in this position until June 2019 when he became the Director of Legislative Affairs.

In June 2020, Ueland left the White House to serve as a Senior Advisor for the Bureau of International Organization Affairs at the Department of State.

In July 2020, Ueland was nominated to be the next Under Secretary of State for Civilian Security, Democracy, and Human Rights, a position which was vacant over the first three and a half years of the Trump Administration.

In November 2020, Ueland became the bureau's Acting Principal Deputy Assistant Secretary. On December 21, 2020, he was tapped to lead the Office of the Under Secretary of State for Civilian Security, Democracy, and Human Rights in an acting capacity with the title of "Senior Official." On December 30, 2020, his nomination was withdrawn by the Trump Administration.

References

External links
 
 U.S. Department of State biography

1965 births
American people of Norwegian descent
Living people
Oregon Republicans
Trump administration personnel
University of San Francisco alumni